Benjamin James Boulware (born August 7, 1994) is a former American football linebacker. He played college football at Clemson. Boulware signed with the Carolina Panthers as an undrafted free agent following the 2017 NFL Draft.

College career
On December 7, 2016, Boulware was awarded the Jack Lambert Trophy, for best linebacker. He was the Defensive MVP of the 2017 College Football Playoff National Championship. Boulware was part of the Clemson team that defeated top-ranked Alabama in the 2017 College Football Playoff National Championship by a score of 35–31. In the game, he recorded six total tackles and one pass defended.

Professional career

Carolina Panthers
Boulware signed with the Carolina Panthers as an undrafted free agent following the 2017 NFL Draft. He was released by the team on September 2, 2017.

San Francisco 49ers
Boulware was signed to the San Francisco 49ers' practice squad on September 5, 2017. He was released from the practice squad on September 12, 2017.

References

External links
Clemson Tigers bio

1994 births
Living people
American football linebackers
Clemson Tigers football players
Players of American football from South Carolina
People from Anderson, South Carolina
Carolina Panthers players
San Francisco 49ers players